Tshediso John Matona is a South African civil servant and former CEO of Eskom.

Matona graduated from the University of Cape Town with a degree in Economics and Politics, and from the University of East Anglia with a Masters in Development Economics. He was previously Director General of the Department of Public Enterprises, and Director General of the Department of Trade and Industry.

References

Year of birth missing (living people)
Living people
University of Cape Town alumni
Alumni of the University of East Anglia